Joseph Manning Inman (December 31, 1875 - March 24, 1954) served in the California Assembly and Senate. From 1913 - 1915, Inman served in the State Assembly for the 7th district. From 1917 - 1934, Inman served in the Senate for the 7th and 19th district.

In 1920 Senator Inman became President of the new Japanese Exclusion League of California. During World War I he also served in the United States Army.

References

United States Army personnel of World War I
Republican Party members of the California State Assembly
Republican Party California state senators
1875 births
1954 deaths